Phyllocnistis embeliella is a moth of the family Gracillariidae, known from Guangdong, China. The host plant for the species is Embelia lacta.

References

Phyllocnistis
Endemic fauna of China